Brian White (born February 3, 1996) is an American professional soccer player who plays as a striker for Major League Soccer club Vancouver Whitecaps FC.

Youth and college soccer
White grew up in Flemington, New Jersey where he attended Hunterdon Central Regional High School and played youth soccer for Players Development Academy (PDA) for nine years. He also played college soccer for four years at Duke University. While with Duke he scored 23 goals in 73 matches.
White also played for the New York Red Bulls U-23 in the Premier Development League (PDL), where he scored 21 goals in 25 appearances. At the conclusion of the 2017 PDL season White was named league MVP and captured the Golden Boot award as he helped lead the team to the PDL Regular Season title.

Career

New York Red Bulls
On January 19, 2018, White was drafted in the first round of the 2018 MLS SuperDraft, by New York Red Bulls. On March 15, 2018, White signed his first professional contract with New York Red Bulls II. He made his professional debut on March 17, 2018 for United Soccer League side New York Red Bulls II, starting in a 2–1 win over Toronto FC II.
White scored his first goal as a professional on March 24, 2018 in a 3–1 loss to Atlanta United 2. On March 31, 2018 White scored the opening goal of the match on a penalty kick and assisted on two other goals in New York's 5–2 victory over Charleston Battery. On April 14, 2018 White  scored two goals in a 5–0 victory over Tampa Bay Rowdies.

On August 4, 2018 it was announced that White had signed an MLS contract with New York Red Bulls, earning promotion to the first team after scoring eight goals and recording five assists in 22 matches with Red Bulls II. On August 29, 2018, White made his first start for New York Red Bulls, scoring the lone goal in a 1–0 victory over Houston Dynamo.

During the 2019 season he was loaned to New York Red Bulls II and on March 24, 2019 scored his first goal of the season in a 1–1 draw with Nashville SC. He was recalled to the first team and due to injuries to starter Bradley Wright-Phillips he became a regular for New York during the 2019 season as he appeared in 21 games and scored nine goals.

During the 2020 season White appeared in 19 matches scoring a team high six goals. He tallied late-match equalizers in consecutive games against Orlando City on October 18 and Chicago Fire on October 24. White was named New York Red Bulls Offensive Player of the Year for the 2020 season on December 21, 2020.

Vancouver Whitecaps FC
On June 2, 2021, White was traded to Vancouver Whitecaps FC in exchange for $400,000 in General Allocation Money and a possible additional $100,000 in conditional General Allocation Money.

Career statistics

Club

Honors
New York Red Bulls
MLS Supporters' Shield: 2018

Vancouver Whitecaps
Canadian Championship: 2022

References

External links 
 
 Duke Profile

1996 births
Living people
American soccer players
Hunterdon Central Regional High School alumni
People from Flemington, New Jersey
Soccer players from New Jersey
Sportspeople from Hunterdon County, New Jersey
USL League Two players
Duke Blue Devils men's soccer players
New York Red Bulls draft picks
New York Red Bulls II players
New York Red Bulls players
Vancouver Whitecaps FC players
USL Championship players
Association football forwards
Major League Soccer players
Expatriate soccer players in Canada